Acrocercops undifraga is a moth of the family Gracillariidae. It is known from Cuba and Haiti.

The larvae feed on Solanum antillarum and Solanum torvum. They probably mine the leaves of their host plant.

References

undifraga
Moths of the Caribbean
Moths described in 1931